Helen Worth  (born Cathryn Helen Wigglesworth; 7 January 1951)  is an English actress. She is best known for portraying the role of Gail Platt in the ITV soap opera, Coronation Street, a role that she has played since 1974. In 2014, she received the Outstanding Achievement Award at the British Soap Awards.

Early life
Cathryn Helen Wigglesworth was born to Alfred and Gladys Wigglesworth in Ossett and grew up in Morecambe, Lancashire. She was brought up in a middle-class family and attended private school. When she was eight her parents fostered Ghanaian-born Wilson Kpikpitse, who was sent to England as an overseas student at the age of eleven and remained with the family for eight years, but moved on following the death of Worth's mother, who was killed in a hit-and-run road accident while she was on a visit to Brighton.

Career 
After graduating from drama school, Worth worked in repertory theatre, which included a year with the BBC Radio repertory company. She has had uncredited bit-parts  in the films Oliver! (1968) and The Prime of Miss Jean Brodie (1969), and appeared on television in the  Doctor Who story Colony in Space (1971), The Doctors, Helen: A Woman of Today (1973), Within These Walls (1974) and The Carnforth Practice (1974). She joined Coronation Street in 1974 and has remained with the soap since then.

Worth has stated that she does not plan to leave Coronation Street, saying she's happy with Gail's never-ending drama, and that it's a job she loves. In an interview with GMTV in January 2010, Worth said she loves Gail's storylines and praised the writers for giving her some great plots over the years, and which she hopes will continue. On 9 June 2014, a one-off special about Worth, Gail & Me, aired on ITV. The 30-minute documentary celebrated Worth's 40 years as Gail.

Personal life
Worth has a house in London. She married Thomas the Tank Engine & Friends narrator Michael Angelis in 1991. Worth forgave Angelis when he admitted to an affair in 1995, but they divorced in 2001 after he had another affair with model Jennifer Khalastchi. Following this, it was mistakenly reported by The Sun newspaper that Worth was dating London restaurant owner Simon Hopkinson.

Charity work
Worth is a patron of the Born Free Foundation, an international wildlife charity working throughout the world to stop individual wild animal suffering and protect threatened species in the wild. She appeared on television fronting campaigns and joined them at the House of Commons in 2006, to speak about the proposed changes to the Animal Welfare Bill and campaign for the retirement of Anne, the UK's last remaining circus elephant.

She is a supporter of the charity ActionAid and has visited Sierra Leone in support of its work there.

Filmography

Awards and nominations

Worth has been honoured twice with the Outstanding Achievement Award at awards ceremonies for her performance as Gail in Coronation Street. In September 2006, Worth won the "Outstanding Achievement Award" at the Inside Soap Awards. Then, on 25 May 2014, Worth won the "Outstanding Achievement Award" at The British Soap Awards 2014 Worth received the British Soap Award for Scene of the Year in 2019 for a monologue she performed, which was also nominated for a BAFTA TV Award. 

Worth was appointed Member of the Order of the British Empire (MBE) in the 2022 Birthday Honours for services to drama.

References

External links
 

1951 births
Living people
English soap opera actresses
English television actresses
People from Ossett
People from Morecambe
Actresses from Yorkshire
Actors from Wakefield
Actresses from Lancashire
20th-century English actresses
21st-century English actresses
Members of the Order of the British Empire